The Curt Gowdy Media Award is an annual award given by the Naismith Memorial Basketball Hall of Fame to outstanding basketball writers and broadcasters. It is named for American sportscaster Curt Gowdy, who was the Hall of Fame's president for seven years.

Recipients
This list of awardees is taken from the website of the Naismith Memorial Basketball Hall of Fame.

Electronic

 1990 Curt Gowdy
 1991 Marty Glickman
 1992 Chick Hearn
 1993 Johnny Most
 1994 Cawood Ledford
 1995 Dick Enberg
 1996 Billy Packer
 1997 Marv Albert
 1998 Dick Vitale
 1999 Bob Costas
 2000 Hubie Brown
 2001 Dick Stockton
 2002 Jim Nantz
 2003 Rod Hundley
 2004 Max Falkenstien
 2005 Bill Campbell
 2006 Bill Raftery
 2007 Al McCoy
 2008 Bob Wolff
 2009 Doug Collins
 2010 Joe Tait
 2011 Jim Durham
 2012 Bill Schonely
 2013 Eddie Doucette
 2014 John Andariese
 2015 Woody Durham
 2016 Jay Bilas
 2017 Craig Sager
 2018 Doris Burke
 2019 Ralph Lawler
 2020 Mike Breen
 2021 Mike Gorman
 2022 Walt Frazier
 2023 Holly Rowe

Print

 1990 Dick Herbert (The News & Observer)
 1991 Dave Dorr (St. Louis Post-Dispatch)
 1992 Sam Goldaper (The New York Times)
 1993 Leonard Lewin (New York Post)
 1994 Leonard Koppett (The New York Times and New York Post)
 1995 Bob Hammel (The Herald-Times)
 1996 Bob Hentzen (The Topeka Capital-Journal)
 1997 Bob Ryan (The Boston Globe)
 1998 Larry Donald (Basketball Times) and Dick Weiss (Daily News)
 1999 Smith Barrier (News & Record)
 2000Dave Kindred (The Sporting News)
 2001 Curry Kirkpatrick (ESPN The Magazine and Sports Illustrated)
 2002 Jim O'Connell (Associated Press)
 2003 Sid Hartman (Star Tribune)
 2004 Phil Jasner (Philadelphia Daily News)
 2005 Jack McCallum (Sports Illustrated)
 2006 Mark Heisler (Los Angeles Times)
 2007 Malcolm Moran (USA Today and The New York Times)
 2008 David DuPree (USA Today) 
 2009 Peter Vecsey (New York Post)
 2010 Jackie MacMullan (The Boston Globe)
 2011 Alexander Wolff (Sports Illustrated)
 2012 Sam Smith (Chicago Tribune)
 2013 John Feinstein (The Washington Post and Sporting News)
 2014 Joe Gilmartin (Phoenix Gazette and Sporting News)
 2015 Rich Clarkson (The Topeka Capital-Journal and National Geographic)
 2016 David Aldridge (The Philadelphia Inquirer and NBA.com)
 2017 Harvey Araton (The New York Times)
 2018 Andy Bernstein (NBA)
 2019 Marc Stein (ESPN and The New York Times)
 2020 Michael Wilbon (The Washington Post)
 2021 Mel Greenberg (The Philadelphia Inquirer)
 2022 M.A. Voepel (ESPN)
 2023 Marc Spears (ESPN and Andscape)

Transformative
 2020 Inside the NBA
 2022 Dick Ebersol
 2023 CBS Sports

Insight
 2020 Jim Gray
 2021 George Kalinsky

See also

List of sportswriters
List of sports journalism awards
List of current National Basketball Association broadcasters
Ford C. Frick Award - MLB's comparable award
Foster Hewitt Memorial Award - the NHL's comparable award
Pete Rozelle Radio-Television Award - the NFL's comparable award

References

1990 establishments in Massachusetts
American basketball trophies and awards
Annual sporting events in the United States
Awards established in 1990

Sportscasting awards
Sports writing awards
American journalism awards
+Curt